Margaret Mazzantini (born 27 October 1961) is an Italian-Irish writer and actress. She became a film, television and stage actor, but is best known as a writer.  Mazzantini began her acting career in 1980 starring in the cult horror classic Antropophagus, she has also appeared in television and theatre.  As a successful writer, her novels include Non ti muovere (Don't Move) which was adapted into a film of the same name and is directed by her husband Sergio Castellitto and stars Penélope Cruz.  Her career as a writer and actress has earned her several awards and nominations including Campiello Awards, a Golden Ticket Award, and a Goya Award.

Early life 
Mazzantini was born in Dublin, Ireland to Carlo Mazzantini, an Italian writer and artist, and Anne Donnelly, an Irish artist. She has three sisters (one of whom is Giselda Volodi). She spent her childhood around Europe, Spain, and Tangier, until the family settled in Tivoli.  In 1982 she graduated from the Academy of Dramatic Arts in Rome.

Career

Acting career

Writing career

Personal life 
She married Sergio Castellitto in 1987. They have four children, Pietro (b. 1992), Maria (b. 1997), Anna (b. 2001) and Cesare (b. 2006).  She lives in Rome.

In 2003, she was awarded the title of Knight Order of Merit of the Italian Republic on the initiative of the President of the Republic.

Filmography

Theatre 
 1982: Ifigenia di Goethe
 1983-1983: Venezia salvata di T.
 1984-1985: La tre sorelle di Cechov (The Three Sisters of Cechov)
 1984-1985: L'onesto Jago di C.
 1984-1985: L'Alcade di Zalamea di Calderon de la Barca (The Governor of Zalamea Calderon de la Barca)
 1985-1986: La Signora Giulia di Strindberg
 1986: Antigone di Sofocle
 1987: Faust di Goethe
 1987: Mon Faust di Paul Valéry
 1988: Bambino di Susan Sontag (Child of Susan Sontag)
 1989: Praga Magica-Valeria (Magic Prague-Valeria)
 1992-1993: A piedi nudi nel parco (Barefoot in the Park)
 1994: Colpi bassi (Low Blows)

Works 
 Il Catino Di Zinco, Venezia : Marsilio Editori, 1994. 
 Manola, Milano : Mondadori, 1998. 
 Non ti muovere, Milano : Mondadori, 2001. 
 translated into English by John Cullen Don't move, London : Chatto & Windus, 2004. 
 adapted as the film Non Ti Muovere (Don't Move), directed by Sergio Castellitto, released 2004
 Zorro. Un eremita sul marciapiede, Milano : Mondadori, 2004. 
 Venuto al mondo, Mondadori, Milano 2008. 
 translated into English by Ann Gagliardi Twice Born, Oxford : Oneworld, 2011. 
 adapted as the film Venuto al mondo, directed by Sergio Castellitto, released 2012
 Nessuno si salva da solo, Milano : Mondadori, 2011, 
 Mare al mattino, Turino: Einaudi, 2011 
 Splendore, Milano, Mondadori, 2013.

Awards and nominations 
 1984: UBU Award - Best Young Actress
 1985: Golden Mask IDI
 1994: Golden Ticket Award
 1994: Rapallo Carige Prize
 1994: Campiello Prize Selection
 2002: Rapallo Carige Prize
 2002: Premio Strega
 2002: Grinzane Cavor Prize
 2002: Bari Award
 2004: Boccaccio Prize
 2005: Silver Ribbon - Best Screenplay (for Don't Move shared with Sergio Castellitto)
 2009: Campiello Prize - for Come to the World
 2004: Nomination - David Award - Best Screenplay (for Don't Move shared with Sergio Castellitto)
 2005: Nomination - CEC Award - Best Screenplay, adapted (for Don't Move shared with Sergio Castellitto)
 2005: Nomination - Goya Award - Best Screenplay, adapted (for Don't Move shared with Sergio Castellitto)

References

External links 

Margaretmazzantini.com

Italian women writers
1961 births
20th-century Irish people
21st-century Irish people
Living people
Writers from Dublin (city)
Strega Prize winners
Accademia Nazionale di Arte Drammatica Silvio D'Amico alumni
Irish people of Italian descent
Italian people of Irish descent
Premio Campiello winners